Helena Mabel Checkley Forrest (6 March 1872 – 18 March 1935) was an Australian writer and journalist.

Life 
Forrest was born near Yandilla, Queensland (now part of Toowoomba Region), the daughter of James Checkley Mills and his wife Margaret Nelson, née Haxell. 
She began writing at an early age but did not publish her first book, The Rose of Forgiveness and other Stories, until 1904.

She became well known as a writer of verse following the publication of her first volume of poems, Alpha Centauri, which appeared in Melbourne in 1909. Her first novel A Bachelor's Wife, was included in the Bookstall series in 1914. The Green Harper (prose and verse) followed in 1915, and Streets and Gardens, a small collection of verse, in 1922.

In 1924 The Wild Moth, a novel, was published in London, and was followed by four other novels, Gaming Gods (1926), Hibiscus Heart (1927), Reaping Roses (1928), and White Witches (1929). Poems by M. Forrest, a collection of her verse contributions to Australian, English and American magazines, was published at Sydney in 1927.

In addition to her work in book form, for the last 30 years of her life Forrest poured out a constant stream of verse and short stories for newspapers and magazines. Her verse is represented in several anthologies.

Death and family
Forrest died of pneumonia on 18 March 1935 in Brisbane, after a long illness. She was twice married and was survived by a daughter. Gaming Gods was dedicated to the memory of her second husband, John Forrest.

Selected works

Novels
 In a Sunny Land  (1906)
 A Bachelor's Wife (1914)
 The Wild Moth (1924)
 Gaming Gods (1926)
 Hibiscus Heart (1927)
 White Witches (1927)
 Reaping Roses (1928)

Collections
 The Rose of Forgiveness, and Other Stories (1904) – short stories
 Alpha Centauri (1909) – poetry
 The Green Harper (1915) – poetry, children's fiction
 Streets and Gardens (1922) – poetry
 Poems (1927) – poetry

References

Sources
Kay Ferres, 'Forrest, Mabel (1872 - 1935)', Australian Dictionary of Biography, Supplementary Volume, Melbourne University Press, 2005, p. 131.

External links
Text of Boy-Dreams from Alpha Centauri.
Text of The Lonely Woman.

1872 births
1935 deaths
Australian women novelists
Australian women poets
20th-century Australian novelists
20th-century Australian women writers
Deaths from pneumonia in Queensland
19th-century Australian women